Paleo movement may refer to:

Paleoconservatism
Paleolibertarianism
Paleolithic lifestyle
Paleo-orthodoxy